Lough is the name given to many lakes in the far north of England in the counties of Northumberland and Cumbria they are often located near the Whin Sill escarpment on which Hadrian's Wall runs. In northern England the word lough in this context is usually pronounced as 'loff'. This reflects the loss in modern standard English of the guttural 'ch' sound (as in Scottish 'loch') which in middle English was represented by 'gh' (as it still is in modern Hiberno-English and Ulster Scots). 

On Haughton Common, near Hadrian's Wall
Broomlee Lough
Crag Lough
Greenlee Lough
Grindon Lough
Halleypike Lough

Elsewhere in Northumberland
Black Lough, Northumberland
Blackaburn Lough
Blaxter Lough
Coldmartin Lough
Darden Lough
Harbottle Lough
Kimmer Lough
Little Lough
Sweethope Loughs
Whitfield Lough
The Lough, on Lindisfarne

In the Lake District and Cumbria
Loughrigg Tarn, and the hill Loughrigg Fell, possibly named after it.

Elsewhere in Cumbria
Monkhill Lough
Thorngill-Lough, North Pennines
Thurstonfield Lough

References

Loughs
 Loughs